Leandro Díaz is a Colombian biographical drama television series produced by RCN Televisión. It tells the story of vallenato music composer Leandro Díaz, played by Silvestre Dangond, based on the book Leandro written by Alonso Sánchez Baute. The series aired from 19 September 2022 to 28 February 2023.

Cast

Main 
 Silvestre Dangond as Leandro Díaz
 Abel Villa as Child Leandro
 Laura De León as Matilde Lina
 Viña Machado as María Ignacia Díaz Ospino
 Aida Bossa as Erótida Duarte
 Johan Rivera as Reinaldo Ramos
 Beto Villa as Toño Salas
 Diego Vásquez as Onofre Duarte
 Mario Espitia as Arturo Díaz

Recurring and guest stars 

 John Bolívar as Chicho Bolaños
 George Slebi as Moisés Cohen
 Antonio Jiménez
 José Chehab
 Carlos Andrés Villa
 Guillermo Vives as Ernesto Ángulo
 Yenifer González
 Edinson Salazar
 Breiner Minota
 Limedes Molina
 Jorge Oñate
 Anggy Pérez
 Ilain Contreras
 Ricardo Lapeira
 David Eduardo Díaz
 Mauro Andrade
 Juan Maya
 Sebastián Parejo
 Jair Romero as Pello Mestre
 Armando Castro
 Carmenza Gómez as Remedios Duarte
 Paula Castaño as Tomasa Díaz
 Daniela Tapia as Magdalena Malagón
 Marciano Martínez as Jose Luis Díaz
 Emilia Ceballos
 Emerson Rodríguez
 Víctor Hugo Ruíz as Julio Pantoja
 María Laura Quintero as Gala Pantoja
 Cristian Villamil as Mauricio Solórzano
 Antonio Cantillo as Laureano Duarte

Ratings

Episodes

Special

Production 
In December 2020, it was announced that RCN Televisión was developing a biographical series based on Leandro Díaz, with Silvestre Dangond being confirmed as the titular character. Filming of the series began on 12 May 2022. On 31 August 2022, it was announced that the series would premiere on 19 September 2022.

References

External links 
 

2022 telenovelas
2022 Colombian television series debuts
2023 Colombian television series endings
Colombian telenovelas
RCN Televisión telenovelas
Spanish-language telenovelas
Television series based on singers and musicians
Television shows set in Colombia